Montana State University is a public research university in Bozeman, Montana.

Montana State University may also refer to:
Montana State University Billings, in Billings, Montana
Montana State University–Northern, in Havre, Montana
Great Falls College Montana State University, in Great Falls, Montana

See also
University of Montana (disambiguation)
Montana University System